Spatsizi Mountain is a mountain in the Spatsizi Plateau, a sub-plateau of the Stikine Plateau in north-central British Columbia, Canada.  The name "Spatsizi" derives from the Sekani language and means "red goat", as mountain goats in this region are known to roll on a particular red mountain, resulting in a red colour to their coats.

See also
Spatsizi Plateau Wilderness Provincial Park
Spatsizi Headwaters Provincial Park
Spatsizi River

References

Two-thousanders of British Columbia
Stikine Plateau
Stikine Country